The 1922–23 St. Francis Terriers men's basketball team represented St. Francis College during the 1922–23 NCAA men's basketball season. The team was coached by Frank Brennan, who was in his second year at the helm of the St. Francis Terriers. The team was not part of a conference and played as division I independents.

The 1922–23 team finished with a .724 record at 21–8.

Roster

Season
James Twohy was the captain of the 1922-23 squad. He helped lead the Terriers to win the Eastern Catholic Collegiate regular season championship.
On February 28, St. Francis played St. Joseph's for the Catholic Intercollegiate Championship of the East.
The March 17th game against Harvard was the first time the two programs met.

Schedule and results

|-
!colspan=12 style="background:#0038A8; border: 2px solid #CE1126;;color:#FFFFFF;"| Regular Season

|-

References

St. Francis Brooklyn Terriers men's basketball seasons
St. Francis
Saint Francis
Saint Francis